The Concord Kannapolis Area Transit, operating under the banner Rider, is the public transit system shared between the cities of Concord and Kannapolis, North Carolina, United States.  It operates local bus service as well as express bus service to neighboring Charlotte.

Routes 
All routes begin and end at the Rider Transit Center in Concord.

 Blue Route – A.L. Brown High School, Amtrak station, YMCA and Jackson Park 
 Brown Route – North Carolina Research Campus and Amtrak station 
 Green Route – Daymark and Walmart/Northlite 
 Orange Route – Carolina Mall, Northeast Medical Center and downtown Concord 
 Purple Route – RCCC Business & Tech Center and Walmart/Concord Commons  
 Red Route – Rowan-Cabarrus Community College and Concord Mills
 Yellow Route – Rowan-Cabarrus Community College, Target/Afton Ridge and Carolina Mall
 Concord Charlotte Express (CCX) – JW Clay LYNX station

References 

Bus transportation in North Carolina
Transportation in Cabarrus County, North Carolina
Transportation in Charlotte, North Carolina